Three O'Clock High is a 1987 American teen comedy film directed by Phil Joanou. The script, about a meek high schooler who is forced into a fight with a volatile new transfer student, is based on the high school experiences of screenwriters Richard Christian Matheson and Thomas Szollosi. It was shot in Ogden, Utah.

Plot

Meek high school student Jerry Mitchell and his sister Brei have the house to themselves while their parents are on vacation. The students this morning are gossiping about the new student Buddy Revell, a violent psychopathic delinquent who has just transferred to Weaver from a continuation high school.

Jerry's first hour is spent at the school newspaper, where his best friend, Vincent Costello, is the editor. Their journalism teacher has the idea of doing an article about Buddy to welcome the "new kid", and she assigns Jerry to do an interview. Jerry sees Buddy in the restroom and clumsily attempts to introduce himself but realizes he is only making Buddy angry. He tells Buddy to disregard the interview request, and gives Buddy a friendly tap on the arm. Buddy, who does not like to be touched, responds by tossing Jerry against a wall and states the pair will fight outside the school at 3:00 P.M. Buddy also tells Jerry that running away or reporting the incident to a teacher will only make the situation worse.

With little more than six hours to go, Jerry tries different strategies to avoid the fight. Trying to reason with Buddy doesn't work. Vincent suggests that he plant a switchblade in Buddy's locker to get him kicked out of school; Brei advises him to simply skip school, but when Jerry tries to leave, he finds the switchblade he planted now stuck in the steering wheel of his Mom’s car, and the ignition wires cut. Trying to run, Jerry is caught by overzealous school security guard, Duke, who finds the switchblade and takes Jerry to the office of Mr. Dolinski, the Dean of Discipline. Doliniski warns Jerry he is under suspicion. 

Jerry makes several other attempts to avoid the fight. All attempts fail, and the clock continues to tick down. Ultimately Buddy accepts cash Jerry stole from the school store in exchange for calling off the fight, but declares Jerry is a coward and that he didn’t even try. Now seized with self-loathing and anger, Jerry decides to confront Buddy, and demands the money back. When Buddy refuses, Jerry insists that he is no coward and declares that their fight is back on.

The clock finally reaches the appointed hour, and the fight begins with hundreds of eager students awaiting the fight outside the school.  Jerry, though out-matched, stands his ground while being knocked down. Vincent unsuccessfully tries to fight Buddy to hold him off for Jerry, and his sister picks up Buddy's dropped brass knuckles and slips them to Jerry. He uses them in a desperate move to stun and knock-out Buddy. During the excitement and appearance of the police that follows, Buddy vanishes while Jerry is allowed to be let go for the day.

The next day, many students show their admiration and support to Jerry for such a great fight. They begin buying individual sheets of paper for $1 from the school store to help Jerry make up the store's missing cash. Buddy suddenly shows up, silencing the crowd. He openly returns the cash to Jerry, begrudgingly showing his respect. Weaver High is now filled with new gossip, as Jerry, who is now dating Karen, replaces Buddy as the school's hot discussion topic, with rumors having a wide and humorous range from the actual truth.

Cast
 Casey Siemaszko as Jerry Mitchell
 Anne Ryan as Franny Perrins
 Richard Tyson as Buddy Revell
 Jonathan Wise as Vincent Costello
 Stacey Glick as Brei Mitchell
 Jeffrey Tambor as Mr. Rice
 Philip Baker Hall as Detective Mulvahill
 John P. Ryan as Mr. O'Rourke
 Theron Read as Mark Bojeekus
 Liza Morrow as Karen Clark
 Guy Massey as Scott Cranston
 Mike Jolly as Craig Mattey
 Scott Tiler as Bruce Chalmer
 Charles Macaulay as Voytek Dolinski
 Caitlin O'Heaney as Miss Farmer
 Alice Nunn as Nurse Palmer
 Paul Feig as Hall monitor
 Mitch Pileggi as Duke, School Security Guard
 Yeardley Smith as Cheerleader

Soundtrack

The film's soundtrack is the thirty-first major release and ninth soundtrack album by Tangerine Dream. Additional music was provided by Sylvester Levay. The song, "Something to Remember Me By", was written and performed by Jim Walker.

Track listing

Personnel
 Edgar Froese
 Chris Franke
 Paul Haslinger

Release

Box office
The film opened in 849 theaters nationwide on October 9, 1987 and earned $1,506,975 on its opening weekend, 40.9% of its total gross. The total lifetime gross is approximately $3,685,862, against the original budget of $5,000,000.

Critical response
The film earned mixed reviews, and has a "rotten" rating of 57% on review aggregator website Rotten Tomatoes based on 14 critical reviews.

Roger Ebert of The Chicago Sun-Times gave the film one out of four stars, declaring the plot to be "pretty stupid" and lamenting that the bully Buddy Revell, "the most interesting character", was underdeveloped.

In a retrospective review from 2016, critic Rob Hunter called the film "a wildly inventive and energetic look at the failures and successes of a typical high school day, and it shapes the daydreams and anxieties into an exaggerated delight."

The dark tone of the film contrasted with other teen films of the time—so much so that executive producer Steven Spielberg removed his name from the credits. In 2017, Adrian Halen wrote that Three O'Clock High was released in "an era when The Breakfast Club, Pretty in Pink, Ferris Bueller's Day Off, National Lampoon’s Vacation and Weird Science were the general norm for moviegoers."

See also
 High Noon, 1952 film
 Fist Fight, 2017 film
 List of teen films

References

External links
 
 
 
 
 

1987 films
1980s high school films
1980s teen comedy films
American high school films
American teen comedy films
1980s English-language films
Films about bullying
Films directed by Phil Joanou
Films scored by Tangerine Dream
Films shot in Utah
Universal Pictures films
1987 directorial debut films
1987 comedy films
Films with screenplays by Richard Christian Matheson
1980s American films